Deshler is the name of some places in the United States of America:

Deshler Hotel
Deshler, Nebraska
Deshler, Ohio
Fort Deshler

Deshler may also refer to a surname:
Donald D. Deshler, American educator
James Deshler, Confederate general in the American Civil War